Roger Richard Edward Chorley, 2nd Baron Chorley (14 August 1930 – 21 February 2016), was a British chartered accountant and peer.

The son of the Robert Chorley, 1st Baron Chorley, Roger Chorley was educated at Stowe School, Buckinghamshire, and at Gonville and Caius College, Cambridge, where he graduated with a Bachelor of Arts in natural sciences and economics in 1953. He succeeded to his father's title in 1978.

Chorley worked for Coopers and Lybrand from 1954 to 1990, as partner from 1967 to 1989. He was a member of the Royal Commission on the Press between 1974 and 1977, and of the Ordnance Survey Review Committee in 1978 and 1979. From 1980 to 1991, he was also a board member of the Royal National Theatre, and from 1981 to 1999 of the British Council. Between 1991 and 1999, he was also the latter's deputy chairman.

Between 1985 and 1987 Chorley chaired the Committee on Handling of Geographic Information, known as the Chorley Committee. This made recommendations on the conversion of Ordnance Survey maps from paper to computer form, making more Government data available, Grid referencing and Postcode referencing of data, measures to promote the use of computerised Geographic Information Systems (GIS) and investment required in training and research and development.

A patron of the British Mountaineering Council, Chorley was further a member of the Top Salaries Review Body from 1981 to 1991, of the Ordnance Survey Advisory Board from 1982 to 1985, and of the Natural Environment Research Council 1988 to 1994. Between 1987 and 1990, he was President of the Royal Geographical Society. He was a member of The Integrated Sciences Advisory Panel.

He was one of the ninety elected hereditary peers to remain in the House of Lords after the House of Lords Act 1999. Being the runner-up in the 1999 election, he replaced the 7th Earl of Carnarvon, after the latter's death in 2001, sitting as a crossbencher. He resigned from the House under the House of Lords Reform Act 2014 on 17 November 2014.

 	
He married Ann Elizabeth Debenham in 1964 and they had two sons. He died on 21 February 2016 at the age of 85. and she died on 20 August 2021 at the age of 90. She is buried at St Michael and All Angels Church, Hawkshead, Cumbria, with a gravestone which marks their lives in the churchyard.

Arms

References

1930 births
2016 deaths
2
Presidents of the Royal Geographical Society
People educated at Stowe School
Crossbench hereditary peers
Chorley
Chorley